Upis is a genus of beetles, belonging to the family Tenebrionidae.

The genus was described in 1792 by Johan Christian Fabricius.

The genus has cosmopolitan distribution.

Species:
 Upis ceramboides (Linnaeus, 1758)

References

Tenebrionidae